The Beeches, also known as the Huntington-Skinner House and Woman's Club of St. Albans, is a historic home located at St. Albans, West Virginia.  It was built about 1874 for Henry Edwards Huntington in the Italianate style.  After its purchase in 1903 by locale magnate J. V. R. Skinner, the two story home was transformed with a mix of formal interior and exterior details and additions.  It commands an excellent view of Kanawha Terrace, a principal street of St. Albans, atop a hill that descends in a gentle slope shaded with trees and shrubbery.

It was listed on the National Register of Historic Places in 1979.

References

Houses completed in 1874
Houses in Kanawha County, West Virginia
Houses on the National Register of Historic Places in West Virginia
Italianate architecture in West Virginia
National Register of Historic Places in Kanawha County, West Virginia
St. Albans, West Virginia
1874 establishments in West Virginia